Georgetown Airport , formerly Q61, is a public airport two miles (3.2 km) northwest of Georgetown, in El Dorado County, California, United States.

Facilities 
The airport has one runway:

 Runway 17/35: 2,980 x 60 ft (908 x 18 m), asphalt

References 
 Official website by County of El Dorado
 Airport Master Record (FAA Form 5010), also available as a printable form (PDF)
FAA NOTAM Search

External links

Airports in El Dorado County, California